Evelyn Violet Elizabeth Emmet, Baroness Emmet of Amberley DL (née Rodd; 18 March 1899 – 10 October 1980) was a British Conservative Party politician.

Early life 
Emmet was the daughter of Lilias Georgina (Guthrie) and the diplomat Rennell Rodd, 1st Baron Rennell. Among her siblings were Francis Rodd, 2nd Baron Rennell (who married the Hon. Mary Constance Vivian Smith), Hon. Gloria Rodd (wife of painter Simon Elwes), Hon. Peter Rodd (who married Nancy Mitford, one of the famous Mitford sisters), and Hon. Gustaf Rodd (who married Yvonne Mary Marling, daughter of diplomat Sir Charles Murray Marling).

She was educated at St Margaret's School, Bushey and at Lady Margaret Hall, Oxford.

Career 
She was a member of London County Council from 1925 to 1934, representing Hackney North, and a member of West Sussex County Council from 1946 to 1967. Emmet was the first Chairman of the Children's Committee of West Sussex County Council and also Chairman of the Child Guidance Committees.

Emmet was a member of the Conservative Women's National Advisory Committee 1951 to 1954.

At the 1955 general election, she was elected as Member of Parliament for East Grinstead.  She held the seat until 1965, when she was elevated to a life peerage as Baroness Emmet of Amberley, of Amberley in the County of Sussex, triggering a by-election in East Grinstead.

In the House of Lords, she served as deputy speaker from 1968 to 1977.

Personal life
On 9 June 1923, she was married to Thomas Addis Emmet, a son of Maj. Robert Emmet (and descendant of Thomas Addis Emmet) and the former Louise Garland (daughter of James Albert Garland). Emmet was a cousin of New York philanthropist Charles Garland. Together, they were the parents of four children:

 Hon. Gloria Lavinia Eileen Emmet (1924–2012), who married Maj. Mark Winton Slane Fleming in 1950.
 Hon. Christopher Anthony Robert Emmet (1925–1996), who married Lady Miranda Mary Fitzalan-Howard, daughter of Bernard Fitzalan-Howard, 3rd Baron Howard of Glossop in 1947.
 Hon. David Alastair Rennell Emmet (b. 1928), who married Sylvia Delia Knowles, daughter of Willis Knowles, in 1967.
 Hon. Penelope Ann Clare Emmet (b. 1932), who married Hugo Money-Coutts, 8th Baron Latymer, son of Thomas Burdett Money-Coutts, 7th Baron Latymer.

Lady Emmet died on 10 October 1980.

Arms

See also
Baron Rennell

References

External links 
 

1899 births
1980 deaths
People educated at St Margaret's School, Bushey
Conservative Party (UK) MPs for English constituencies
Female members of the Parliament of the United Kingdom for English constituencies
UK MPs 1955–1959
UK MPs 1959–1964
UK MPs 1964–1966
UK MPs who were granted peerages
Members of London County Council
Members of West Sussex County Council
Emmet of Amberley, Evelyn Emmet, Baroness
Life peeresses created by Elizabeth II
Emmet of Amberley, Evelyn Emmet, Baroness
Alumni of Lady Margaret Hall, Oxford
Deputy Lieutenants of West Sussex
20th-century British women politicians
People from Amberley, West Sussex
20th-century English women
20th-century English people
Women councillors in England
Emmet